"Hearts Are Gonna Roll" is a song co-written and recorded by American country music artist Hal Ketchum. It was released in February 1993 as the second single from his album Sure Love. The song reached number 2 on the Billboard Hot Country Singles & Tracks chart in May 1993.  It was written by Ketchum and Ronny Scaife.

Chart performance
"Hearts Are Gonna Roll" debuted at number 63 on the U.S. Billboard Hot Country Singles & Tracks for the week of February 20, 1993.

Year-end charts

References

1993 singles
Hal Ketchum songs
Songs written by Hal Ketchum
Song recordings produced by Allen Reynolds
Curb Records singles
Songs written by Ronny Scaife
1992 songs